Styletoentomon is a genus of proturans in the family Eosentomidae.

Species
 Styletoentomon rostratum (Ewing, 1940)
 Styletoentomon styletum Copeland, 1978

References

Protura